Eva Feder Kittay is an American philosopher. She is Distinguished Professor of Philosophy (Emerita) at Stony Brook University. Her primary interests include feminist philosophy, ethics, social and political theory, metaphor, and the application of these disciplines to disability studies. Kittay has also attempted to bring philosophical concerns into the public spotlight, including leading The Women's Committee of One Hundred in 1995, an organization that opposed the perceived punitive nature of the social welfare reforms taking place in the United States at the time.

Education and career
Kittay received her bachelor's degree from Sarah Lawrence College in 1967, and went on to receive her doctoral degree from the Graduate Center of the City University of New York in 1978.  After receiving her doctorate, she accepted a position as visiting assistant professor of philosophy at the University of Maryland, College Park for the 1978–1979 year, before accepting a permanent position at Stony Brook University in 1979 as assistant professor. Kittay was promoted to associate professor in 1986, and full professor in 1993.  Kittay received a distinguished professorship from Stony Brook in 2009. Kittay is also a senior fellow at the Center for Medical Humanities, Compassionate Care, and Bioethics at Stony Brook, and a women's studies associate. In addition to these permanent positions, Kittay has accepted a  variety of temporary appointments, including ones at Sarah Lawrence College and Newcastle University.  She has received numerous awards, including a Guggenheim Fellowship, and NEH Fellowship, and the Lebowitz Prize for philosophical achievement and contribution from the American Philosophical Association and Phi Beta Kappa. She is the mother of a multiple disabled woman and has also been recognized for her writing on disability by the Institute Mensch, Ethiks, und Wissenshaft, The Center for Discovery and IncludeNYC. She was named Woman of the Year by the Society for Women in Philosophy 2003–2004. She served as the president of the American Philosophical Association, Eastern Division, 2016–2017.

Research areas 
Kittay's research has focused on feminist philosophy, ethics, social and political theory, the philosophy of disability, metaphor, and the application of these disciplines to disability studies.  Her viewpoints on the ethics of care are quite similar to those of Virginia Held and Sara Ruddick – namely that human interactions occur between people who are unequal yet interdependent, and that practical ethics should be fitted to life as most people experience it. Kittay has also extended the work of John Rawls to address the concerns of women and the cognitively disabled. In developing the ethics of care, her most significant contribution has been the emphasis on the inevitable fact of human dependency and the need to incorporate such dependency and dependency work into ethical and political theories.  She has been one of the major voices in the emergent field of philosophy of disability, focusing in particular on cognitive disability.

Selected bibliography

Books

Edited books 
 Kittay, Eva; Licia Carlson (2010).  Cognitive disability and its challenge to moral philosophy.  New York, Oxford: Wiley-Blackwell Publishing. .

Selected chapters in books

References

21st-century American philosophers
American women philosophers
American ethicists
Feminist philosophers
Political philosophers
Sarah Lawrence College alumni
Social philosophers
Presidents of the American Philosophical Association
Stony Brook University faculty
Living people
Year of birth missing (living people)
Disability studies academics
21st-century American women